Kang Yeoun-hee (born 15 October 1992) is a South Korean weightlifter. In 2019, at the Asian Weightlifting Championships held in Ningbo, China, she won the gold medal in the women's 81kg event.

In 2020, she won the gold medal in the women's 87kg event at the Roma 2020 World Cup in Rome, Italy.

She represented South Korea at the 2020 Summer Olympics in Tokyo, Japan. She finished in 9th place in the women's 87 kg event.

References

External links 
 

Living people
1992 births
Place of birth missing (living people)
South Korean female weightlifters
Weightlifters at the 2020 Summer Olympics
Olympic weightlifters of South Korea
21st-century South Korean women